Five Points is an extinct town that was located in Liberty Township in Warren County, Indiana, on U.S. Route 41.

Even though the community no longer exists, it is still cited by the USGS.

Geography
The site is near the intersection of US Route 41 with Five Points Road and County Road 25 East.

References

Former populated places in Warren County, Indiana
Ghost towns in Indiana